Seven Sisters is the second studio album by Swedish singer-songwriter Meja, released in 1998 by Columbia Records. Again she collaborated with Billy Steinberg, along with her producer Douglas Carr and Jörgen Elofsson. The album came to be her international breakthrough with her massive hit "All 'Bout the Money". The song was released worldwide and gave her awards such as "Best Album of the Year" “Best selling Scandinavian artist" at the World Music Awards in Monte Carlo and "Best Pop Album" The album also features singles like "Intimacy" and "Pop & Television" The album sold approximately 1 million units worldwide. "All About the Money" was also featured as a soundtrack to the Chevy Chase movie Funny Money in 2006. The album was produced by Douglas Carr.

Track listing

Chart positions

Year-end charts

Certifications

References

 

1998 albums
Meja albums